The 2016 United States House of Representatives elections in Washington were held on November 8, 2016, to elect the 10 U.S. representatives from the state of Washington, one from each of the state's 10 congressional districts. The elections coincided with the 2016 U.S. presidential election, as well as other elections to the House of Representatives, elections to the United States Senate and various state and local elections. The primaries were held on August 2.

District 1

Democrat Suzan DelBene is the incumbent of the 1st district, which has a PVI of D+4. DelBene was first elected in 2012. The district stretches along the Puget Sound from the Canada–US border to King County. Elizabeth Scott began a campaign to run for the Republican nomination. However, she later suspended her campaign due to health reasons.

Primary election

Results

General election

Results

Official campaign websites
Suzan DelBene for Congress
Robert J. Sutherland for Congress

District 2

Primary election

Results

General election

Results

Official campaign websites
Rick Larsen for Congress
Marc Hennemann for Congress

District 3

Republican Jaime Herrera Beutler, first elected in 2010, is the incumbent in the 3rd district. The district, which has a PVI of R+2, encompasses the southwestern portion of the state.

Primary election

Results

General election

Results

Official campaign websites
Jaime Herrera Beutler for Congress
Jim Moeller for Congress

District 4

Primary election

Results

General election

Results

Official campaign websites
Dan Newhouse for Congress

District 5

Republican Cathy McMorris Rodgers, first elected in 2004, is the incumbent in the 5th district. The district, which as a PVI of R+6, encompasses the eastern portion of the state. Joe Pakootas is running as a Democrat. Dave Wilson is running as an Independent.

Primary election

Results

General election

Results

Official campaign websites
Cathy McMorris Rodgers for Congress
Joe Pakootas for Congress

District 6

Democrat Derek Kilmer, first elected in 2012, is the incumbent in the 6th district. The district has a PVI of D+5, and encompasses the Olympic Peninsula and surrounding areas, as well as most of Tacoma.

Primary election

Results

General election

Results

Official campaign websites
Derek Kilmer for Congress
Todd Bloom for Congress

District 7

Democrat Jim McDermott has represented the seventh district since 1989 and announced on January 4, 2016, that he would not seek re-election.

An anonymous post to Reddit in October 2015 claimed that McDermott was planning on retiring and endorsing current Seattle Mayor Ed Murray to succeed him. Murray and McDermott both denied the rumor.

Primary election

Candidates
 Carl Cooper (Independent)
 Pramila Jayapal (Democrat), state senator
 Arun Jhaveri (Democrat), former mayor of Burien, Washington
 Craig Keller (Republican)
 Joe McDermott (Democrat), King County Council Chair
 Leslie Regier (Independent)
 Don Rivers (Democrat)
 Scott Sutherland (Republican)
 Brady Walkinshaw (Democrat), state representative

Endorsements

Results

General election

Polling

Results

Official campaign websites
Pramila Jayapal for Congress
Brady Walkinshaw for Congress

District 8

Republican Dave Reichert, first elected in 2004, is the incumbent in the 8th district. The district has a PVI of R+1, and includes the Eastside suburbs of Seattle and portions of the center of the state.

Reichert considered running for governor, but decided instead to run for re-election.

Businessman Santiago Ramos is running as a Democrat. Businessman Jason Ritchie, Reichert's 2014 general election opponent, had considered running again but announced he will instead run for the Washington House of Representatives.

Primary election

Results

General election

Results

Official campaign websites
Dave Reichert for Congress 
Tony Ventrella for Congress

District 9

Primary election

Results

General election

Results

Official campaign websites
Adam Smith for Congress
Doug Basler for Congress

District 10

Democrat Dennis Heck, first elected in 2012, is the incumbent in the 10th district. The district has a PVI of D+5, and encompasses the state capital of Olympia and surrounding areas.

Primary election

Results

General election

Results

Official campaign websites
Dennis Heck for Congress
Jim Postma for Congress

References

External links
U.S. House elections in Washington, 2016 at Ballotpedia
Campaign contributions at OpenSecrets

House
Washington
2016